Hånes is a district in the city of Kristiansand in Agder county, Norway. It has a population of about 4,000 (2014). Hånes is a part of the borough of Oddernes and it borders the districts of Søm and Randesund to south, the district of Tveit to north, the municipality of Lillesand to east, and the Topdalsfjorden to west.
  Hånes Church is located in this district.

Neighbourhoods
Berhus
Brattbakken
Grovikheia
Hånes
Hånes nordvest
Hånes nordøst
Hånestangen
Vigevollåsen

Transportation

European route E18 goes south for Hånes while Norwegian National Road 41 goes east for Hånes.

Politics
The 10 largest political parties in Hånes in 2015:

Photos

References

Populated places in Agder
Geography of Kristiansand
Boroughs of Kristiansand